Şebinkarahisar is a town in and the administrative seat for Şebinkarahisar District, Giresun Province in the Black Sea region of northeastern Turkey.

Name
The 6th century Byzantine historian Procopius writes that the Roman general Pompey captured the then ancient fortress and renamed it Colonia, in Greek Koloneia (Κολώνεια). A Greek inscription of the ninth or tenth century found in the fortress securely identifies Şebinkarahisar with Koloneia. Curiously, the Seljuk historian Ibn Bibi and 14th-century coins minted by the Eretnids record an Armenian variation of the name, Koğoniya. The historical Turkish form of this name was Kuğuniya.

In the 11th century, a second name becomes associated with the place: the town retains the name Koloneia but the fortress above is called Mavrokastron, Greek for "Black Fortress". The Turkish toponym Karahisar (Greek: Γαράσαρη, actual Turkish name of the district: Gareysar), appearing first in the 14th century, is a translation of Mavrokastron. The town was later called Şapkarahisar ("Black Fortress of Alum") or Kara Hisar-ı Şarkî/Şarkî Kara Hisar ("Black Fortress of the East") to differentiate it from Afyonkarahisar farther to the west. The place has been known as Şebinkarahisar since the 19th century and both names were used. On 11 October 1924 Mustafa Kemal visited this town and proposed to be used the name Şebin Karahisar. The geographical historian Ramsay, indicated that the Armenians still call this city Nikopoli (Greek: Νικόπολη);, so do the Pontic Greeks till nowadays. It should not be confused with the nearby Koyulhisar, where the ruins of ancient Roman Nikopoli lie.

History
The recorded history of Şebinkarahisar begins with the Third Mithridatic War. After the defeat of Mithridates VI, Pompey strengthened the town's fortifications and founded a Roman colony (colonia).

In the Byzantine period, the city was rebuilt by Justinian I (r. 527–565). In the 7th century, it became part of the Armeniac Theme, and later of Chaldia, before finally becoming the seat of a separate theme by 863. It was attacked by Arab raids in 778 and in 940.

Şebinkarahisar fell to the Seljuk Turks soon after the Battle of Manzikert in 1071. It remained in Turkish hands since, with the exception of a short-lived Byzantine recovery ca. 1106. Through the following centuries, the fortress occupied a strategic position on the frontier between the Turkish-controlled interior and the Empire of Trebizond. The Danishmends held the fortress until the 1170s, when it passed into the hands of the Saltukids of Erzurum. In 1201/1202 the Mengujekids, vassals of the Seljuks of Rum, took over. Following the Mongol invasion of the mid-13th century, the fortress was under command of the Eretnids, who minted coins in the town. A succession of petty Turkmen warlords controlled the town until Uzun Hasan of the Ak Koyunlu took over in 1459, perhaps believing that the place constituted part of the dowry of his new Greek wife, the daughter of John IV of Trebizond.

Mehmed II took the town for the Ottomans from Ak Koyunlu in 1461, and consolidated his rule over the area in 1473 following his defeat of Uzun Hasan at the Battle of Otluk Beli. From Şebinkarahisar he sent a series of letters announcing his victory, including an unusual missive in the Uyghur language addressed to the Turkmen of Anatolia. A careful survey of the fortifications above the town has revealed that the Ottomans invested heavily in repairs to the original Late Antique-Byzantine-Seljuk walls and, in addition,  constructed an impressive “citadel complex” at the summit.  It became a sanjak centre as "Karahisar-I Şarki", initially in Rum Eyalet (1473-1514 and again 1520-1555), Bayburt Eyalet (1514-1516), Diyarbekir Eyalet (1516-1520), Erzurum Eyalet (1555-1805), Trabzon Eyalet (1805-1865) and Sivas Vilayet (1865-1923).

According to the Ottoman General Census of 1881/82-1893, the kaza of Şebinkarahisar (Karahisar-i Şarki) had a total population of 35.051, consisting of 19.421 Muslims, 8.512 Greeks and 7.118 Armenians.

The Shabin-Karahisar uprising

Şebinkarahisar was one of the few locations where Armenians actively resisted the Armenian genocide.
 
As news of deportations and massacres in other parts of the Ottoman Empire reached the town, its Armenian population decided to make preparations for self-defence. On June 15, 1915 some 300 Armenians, mostly wealthy merchants, were arrested. On the following day, after further attempted arrests, fighting erupted and barricades were erected in the town's Armenian districts. By June 18 most of those districts had fallen or been abandoned. Some 5,000 Armenians from the town and nearby villages, 75% of them women and children, retreated into Şebinkarahisar's medieval fortress. It was then surrounded by Turkish troops, who directed heavy artillery at its walls. On the night of July 11, with food, water, and ammunition almost exhausted, the Armenians decided to secretly evacuate the fortress. However, the attempt was discovered and all who had left were killed. On July 12 those still inside the fortress surrendered. A massacre then followed in which all Armenian men were killed. Women and children survivors were held prisoner in the town before being deported like those of other towns. Official Turkish records claim that during the revolt the Armenian rebels killed 403 civilian Turkish villagers.

The Republic of Turkey
When the republic was founded in 1923 the 10th Army was garrisoned here, bringing a boost to the local economy. Atatürk visited in 1924, on his way from seeing earthquake damage in Erzurum.

Geography

Şebinkarahisar itself is a quiet town of 13,200 (TÜİK 2008) people, 40 km from the provincial city of Giresun, standing on the north side of the valley of the river Avutmuş in the Giresun Mountains.

The town is hard to reach, the road along the riverbank is windy and narrow, and services are hard to provide.

The Şebin walnut''' is a particular variety of walnut, grown on the valley sides, another local delicacies include a helva made from hazelnuts, Hoşmerim a kind of cheese pudding, small bread loaves called gilik, the corn and chick pea soup toyga çorbası, dolma made from the leaves of Curled Dock evelik'', stewed nettles and most of all the mulberry syrup, pekmez.

Places of interest
 Şebinkarahisar castle
 Behramşah Cami - mosque built by the Seljuk Turks, in the neighbourhood of Avutmuş.
 Taşhanlar - Ottoman-period stone caravanserai, at the entrance to the castle
 Fatih Cami - Ottoman mosque next to the castle

Notable people
Katakalon Kekaumenos, prominent Byzantine general of the mid-11th century
İdil Biret (born 1941), pianist. Her mother is from a Şebinkarahisar family
Rahşan Ecevit (1923–2020), political leader and wife of former Prime Minister of Turkey Bülent Ecevit
Ara Güler (1928–2018), Armenian photographer, born to a Şebinkarahisar family,
Aziz Nesin (1915–1995), writer, was born to a Şebinkarahisar family and at one stage campaigned for Şebinkarahisar to be made again into a province in its own right
Aram Haigaz (1900–1986), Armenian writer
Andranik Ozanian (1865–1927), an Armenian general and national hero
Harutiun Shahrigian (1860–1915), Armenian politician, soldier, lawyer, and author
Toros Toramanian (1864–1934), an Armenian architect
Mehmet Emin Yurdakul (1869–1944), writer, former member of parliament for Şebinkarahisar
Erdal Eren (1963–1980), political activist.
Ashot Zorian (1905–1970), Turkish-born Egyptian painter and educator of Armenian ethnicity; lived in Şebinkarahisar in the 1910s

References

External links 
 Photos of Şebinkarahisar
 Carefully documented photographic survey and plan of the fortress at Şebinkarahisar 
 The District Governorate 
 The Municipality 
 Local İnformation 
 More Photos 
 Local News 

 
Populated places in Giresun Province
Towns in Turkey